The Renault Energy engine also known as "E engine" or "E-Type" (E for Energy) is an automotive gasoline four-stroke inline four cylinder internal combustion engine, with a sleeved water cooled cast iron block, equipped with 5 crankshaft bearings, an overhead camshaft driven by a toothed timing belt and an aluminum cylinder head with 8 overhead valves. Developed and produced by Renault in the late 1980s, the engine made its first appearance in the Renault 19.

History 
In the late 1980s, the Cléon-Fonte engine still fitted to the R4, Super 5, R9, R11 and Express had become outdated with its lateral camshaft design. Competing brands were building more modern engines with overhead camshafts. The Cléon-Fonte engine had first appeared in 1962 on the Renault 8 and Renault Floride.

For the successor of the R9 and R11, the R19, Renault would develop a more modern engine. Renault modernized its old Cléon-Fonte motor with a new hemispheric cylinder head and an overhead camshaft, driven by a toothed timing belt, which appeared as the Energy in 1988. This new engine would go on to be used in the Clio 1, Mégane 1 and even Express. The Energy engine has also equipped the Renault 9 in Argentina, Colombia and Turkey.

However, at the launch of the Renault Twingo in 1993, Renault would be forced to continue production of the Cléon-Fonte engine because the "E engine", due to its hemispherical cylinder head and front exhaust, was too large to accommodate in the Twingo. The Energy (E7F) was gradually replaced with the D7F engine in 1996 on the Renault Clio, due to new standards of pollution control and lower fuel consumption required for more modern engines. The D7F engine simultaneously replaced the 1.2 Energy and the 1.2 Cléon-Fonte.

The E7J was replaced by the K7J engine.

Different cylinder capacity

Evolution Engine
The Energy engine evolved into the K engine that appeared on the Megane 1. The main difference is the machining of the cylinders since this engine has removable liners. The head of the Energy engine is kept on 8 valve versions. The K engine was also developed in 16-valve versions and was available as a diesel (K9K - 1.5 dCi).

ExF
The ExF displaces . The E5F is carbureted while the E7F has an electronically controlled single-point injection coupled to a catalytic converter. Output ranges between  depending on model year and application.

Applications:
 E5F
 1991–1997 Renault Clio
 E7F
 1988–1990 Renault R19
 1991–1997 Renault Clio

ExJ
The ExJ displaces 

Applications:
 E6J (carbureted)
 1988–1995 Renault R19
 1991–1997 Renault Clio
 E7J (fuel injected)
 1989– Renault Extra
 1988–2000 Renault R19
 1991–1997 Renault Clio
 1996–1999 Renault Mégane
 –1988 Renault 9
 1998–2001 Renault Kangoo
 1997–2001 Renault Clio
 2000–2003 Dacia SupeRNova
 2003–2005 Dacia Solenza

References

E
Gasoline engines by model
Straight-four engines